Daniel Robin (31 May 1943 – 23 May 2018) was a French wrestler who was inducted into the United World Wrestling Hall of Fame in 2012.

Robin was born in Bron, Rhône. He was Olympic silver medalist in both Freestyle wrestling and Greco-Roman wrestling in 1968, making a record as the first wrestler winning two silver medals at the same Olympic Games. Also competing at the 1972 Olympics, he won a gold medal at the 1967 World Wrestling Championships.

Robin continued his career among the wrestling circle and became the head coach for French national team, then vice-president of the French Wrestling Federation, and shifted to become a technical delegate for FILA and United World Wrestling. For the 2012 London Olympics organizing committee, Robin was named the director of the wrestling operations in 2010.

Daniel Robin died on 23 May 2018 in Longueuil, Quebec, Canada at the age of 74.

References

External links
 

1943 births
2018 deaths
People from Bron
Olympic wrestlers of France
Wrestlers at the 1968 Summer Olympics
Wrestlers at the 1972 Summer Olympics
French male sport wrestlers
Olympic silver medalists for France
Olympic medalists in wrestling
Medalists at the 1968 Summer Olympics
World Wrestling Championships medalists
Mediterranean Games medalists in wrestling
Mediterranean Games gold medalists for France
Competitors at the 1967 Mediterranean Games
Sportspeople from Lyon Metropolis